This is a list of notable people from Karnataka, India. In order to be included, a person of influence needs only to have been born in Karnataka. This article can be expanded to accommodate newly surfacing information.

Arts and entertainment

Cinema

 Ambareesh
 Ananth Nag
 Aniruddha Jatkar
 Aishwarya rai
 Ananya Kasaravalli
 Anuradha Paudwal
 Anushka Shetty
 Arati Ankalikar-Tikekar
 Arjun Sarja
 Aruna Balraj
 Arthi
 Atul Kulkarni
 A. T. Raghu
 B. Saroja Devi
 B. C. Patil
 B. S. Ranga
 B. V. Karanth
 Bala
 Balakrishna
 Balaraj
 Bank Janardhan
 Bharathi Vishnuvardhan
 Bhargavi Narayan
 Bhavana
 Bhavani Prakash
 Bianca Desai
 Chandrika
 Chandulal Jain
 Chetan Kumar
 Darshan Tugudeep
 Daisy Bopanna
 Deepika Padukone
 Devaraj
 Dinesh
 Dingri Nagaraj
 Dwarakesh
 Ere Gowda
 Ganesh
 Ganesh Hegde
 G. V. Iyer
 Geetha
 Girish Karnad
 Girish Kasaravalli
 Gulshan Devaiah
 Guru Dutt
 Hansika Motwani
 Harshika Poonacha
 Hema Bellur
 Hema Prabhath
 Honnavalli Krishna
 Jaggesh
 Jayant Kaikini
 Kalpana
 Kalyan Kumar
 Kashinath
 Keerthiraj
 Keerthi Bhat
 Kunigal Nagabhushan
 Lakshmi Chandrashekar
 Lakshmi Rai
 Leelavathi
 Leena Chandavarkar
 Lokesh
 M. S. Sathyu
 Madhuri Itagi
 Mandeep Roy
 Manjula
 Master Hirannaiah
 Master Manjunath
 Michael Madhu
 Milind Gadagkar
 Mohan
 Mysore Lokesh
 Nagathihalli Chandrashekar
 Narasimharaju
 Negro Johnny
 Nidhi Subbaiah
 Nirmala Chennappa
 Nishan K. P. Nanaiah
 Padma Vasanthi
 Padmaja Rao
 Pandari Bai
 Pattabhirama Reddy, settler
 Pooja Lokesh
 Pradeep Uppoor
 Prakash Rai
 Prabhu Deva, settler
 Pramila Joshai
 Prathap
 Prema
 Puneeth Rajkumar
 Puttana Kanagal
 Raam Reddy
 Radhika Pandit
 Raghavendra Rajkumar
 Rajanikanth
 Rajesh Krishnan, settler
 Rajkumar
 Raju Sundaram, settler
 Raj B. Shetty
 Rakshita
 Ramesh Arvind
 Ram Kumar
 Ramu
 Ramya
 Ravichandran, settler
 Raju Talikote
 Rashmi 
 Rashmika Mandanna
 Rekha Das
 Rockline Venkatesh
 Rohit Shetty
 Roopa Iyer, settler
 R.T. Rama
 Sarigama Viji
 Sakshi Shivanand
 Sanchita Shetty
 Sandeep Chowta
 Sanketh Kashi
 Sathyabhama
 Satyajith
 Shamita Shetty
 Shani Mahadevappa
 Shankar Nag
 Shanthamma
 Shashi Kumar
 Shivarajkumar
 Shilpa Shetty
 Shobraj
 Shraddha Srinath
 Shruti Naidu
 Shylaja Nag
 Sihi Kahi Chandru
 Sihi Kahi Geetha
 Sneha Ullal
 Soundarya
 Srinivas Prabhu
 Sudha Baragur
 Sudha Belawadi
 Sudha Narasimharaju
 Sunil
 Srimurali
 Srinath
 Sudha Rani
 Sudheer
 Suman Nagarkar
 Suman Ranganathan
 Sundar Krishna Urs
 Sundar Raj
 Sunil Shetty
 Sunil Kumar Desai
 Sudeepa
 Syed Aman Bachchan
 T. S. Nagabharana
 Tara
 Tiger Prabhakar
 Umashri
 Upendra
 Vajramuni
 Vaishali Desai
 Vasundhara Das
 Vanishree
 Vijay Kashi
 Vinayak Joshi
 Vishnuvardhan
 Yashwant Sardeshpande

Theatre

 Arundhati Nag
 Bhargavi Narayan
 B. V. Karanth
 Chandrashekhar Kambara
 Chindodi Leela
 Girish Karnad
 Gubbi Veeranna
 K. V. Subbanna
 Kalpana
 Lakshmi Chandrashekar
 Lokesh
 Master Hirannaiah
 Mukhyamantri Chandru
 Prasanna
 Shankar Nag
 Shivananda
 Umashree
 Vajramuni
 Yashwant Sardeshpande

Ancient architecture and sculpture
 Amarashilpi Jakanachari
 Gundan Anivaritachari
 Ruvari Malithamma

Modern and contemporary art, art criticism

 Dattatreya Aralikatte
 Renuka Kesaramadu
 Ashwini Bhat
 Surekha
 S. G. Vasudev
 Yusuf Arakkal

Music

Classical music - Carnatic

 Gopala Dasa
 Harikesanallur Muthayya Bhagavathar
 Jagannatha Dasa
 Kadri Gopalnath
 Jyotsna Srikanth
 Kanakadasa
 Maharaja Jayachamaraja Wadiyar
 Dr.Mysore Manjunath
 Mysore Sadasiva Rao
 Mysore V. Ramarathnam
 Mysore Vasudevacharya
 Mysore Nagaraj
 N. Ravikiran
 Purandaradasa
 R. K. Srikanthan
 R.R. Keshavamurthy
 Sripadaraya
 T. Chowdiah
 Vadiraja
 Vijaya Dasa
 Vyasatirtha
 Doraiswamy Iyengar
 Veene Sheshanna
 Vittal Ramamurthy
 Ghatam Udupa
 K. V. Krishna Prasad
 B. Shankar Rao
 Anoor Anantha Krishna Sharma
 M. S. Sheela

Classical music - Hindustani

 Basavaraja Rajaguru, vocal
 Bhimsen Joshi, vocal
 Bapu Padmanabha, bansuri
 S. Ballesh, vocal and shehnai
 Ganapati Bhat, vocal
 Gangubai Hangal, vocal
 Gururao Deshpande, vocal
 Jayateerth Mevundi, vocal
 Kumar Gandharva, vocal
 Lalith J. Rao, vocal
 Madhava Gudi, vocal
 Mallikarjun Mansur, vocal
 Milind Chittal, vocal
 Nachiketa Sharma, vocal
 Nagaraja Rao Havaldar, vocal
 Pravin Godkhindi, bansuri
 Puttaraja Gawai, vocal
 Rajeev Taranath, sarod
 Sanjeev Chimmalgi, vocal
 Sangeetha Katti, vocal
 Sawai Gandharva, vocal
 Shobha Gurtu, vocal
 Smita Bellur, vocal
 Taranath Ram Rao Hattiangadi, tabla
 Pandit Venkatesh Kumar, vocal
 Vinayak Torvi, vocal
 Keshav Ginde, flute
 Madhav Gudi, vocal
 Panchakshari Gawai, vocal

Modern musicians

Mysore Ananthaswamy, bhavageete
P. Kalinga Rao, bhavageete
 Pandit Narasimhalu Vadavati
S. Ballesh, shehnai and vocal
Mysore Manjunath
Pravin Godkhindi, flute
Shimoga Subbanna, Sugama Sangeetha
C. Ashwath, Sugama Sangeetha
Balappa Hukkeri, folklore
G.V. Atri, bhavageete
Ganesh Hegde, choreography
Biddu Appaiah, composer 
Bapu Padmanabha, flute

Film music

Anoop Seelin
Arjun
B. V. Karanth
C. Ashwath
G. K. Venkatesh
G. V. Iyer, settler
Gurukiran
S. Ballesh, playback singer, music director, shehnai
Hamsalekha
Jayant Kaikini
Mano Murthy
Rajan–Nagendra
Ravichandran
Sadhu Kokila
Sandeep Chowta
Shankar–Ganesh
V. Harikrishna
V. Manohar
Vijaya Bhaskar
Raghu Dixit
Bapu Padmanabha

Film singers
Nanditha
Rajkumar
Rajesh Krishnan
Vijay Prakash
Chetan Sosca

Dance
 Maya Rao (1928-2014), Kathak Guru and founder of NIKC, Bangalore

Fashion
Deepika Padukone
Prasad Bidapa

Kings and nobles

Aliya Rama Raya
Abbakka Rani
Amoghavarsha I
Basaveshwara
Bijjala II
Bukka Raya I
Butuga II
Chikkadevaraja Wodeyar
Chamundaraya
Chand Bibi
Devaraya I
Deva Raya II
Dhruva Dharavarsha
Durvinita
Govinda III
Hyder Ali
Harihara I
Ibrahim Adil Shah II
Indra III
Jayachamaraja Wodeyar
Kempe Gowda
Krishna III
Krishnadeva Raya
Krishnaraja Wodeyar IV
Madakari Nayaka
Mayuravarma
Pulakesi II
Rani Chennamma of Keladi
Rani Chennamma of Kittur
Saluva Narasimha Deva Raya
Sangolli Rayanna, army chief of the Kingdom of Kittur
Tailapa II
Tippu Sultan
Veera Ballala II
Veera Ballala III
Vikramaditya II
Vikramaditya VI
Vishnuvardhana

Industrialists and businesspeople

 A. B. Shetty, founder of Vijaya Bank
 Ammembal Subba Rao Pai, founder of Canara Bank
 B. R. Shetty, NMC Group
 G. R. Gopinath, founder of Deccan Aviation
 Gururaj Deshpande, venture capitalist
 K. V. Kamath, managing director and CEO of ICICI Bank
 Kiran Mazumdar-Shaw, Biocon India Ltd.
 N. R. Narayana Murthy, Infosys Technologies, Ltd.
 N S Narendra, founder of FirePro
 Nandan Nilekani, Infosys Technologies, Ltd.
 Phaneesh Murthy, iGATE Global Solutions, Ltd.
 R. N. Shetty, Murdeshwar Group
 T. M. A. Pai, co-founder of Syndicate Bank and Manipal Academy of Higher Education
 V. G. Siddhartha, Cafe Coffee Day
 Vaman Srinivas Kudva, co-founder of Syndicate Bank
 Vijay Mallya, UB Group
 Vijay Sankeshwar, Vijayanand Group
 Vittal Mallya, UB Group
 Pradeep Kar, Microland
 Ashok Kheny, NICE
 Thumbay Moideen, founder of Thumbay Group and Gulf Medical University

Health care
Dr. H. Sudarshan Ballal
Dr. C. N. Manjunath, cardiologist 
Dr. M. C. Modi, eye surgeon
Dr. Sharan Patil, orthopaedic surgeon
Dr. Y. G. Parameshwara
Dr. Devi Shetty, cardiovascular surgeon

Science and technology
Science

C. N. R. Rao, chemistry
C. R. Rao, statistics
N. K. Naik, Professor Emeritus at IIT Bombay
M. C. Modi, ophthalmology
Narayan Hosmane, biochemistry, cancer research
Raja Ramanna, physics
Roddam Narasimha, aerospace, atmospheric sciences
U. R. Rao, space science
M.L. Kulkarni, pediatrician
B. N. Suresh
S. K. Shivkumar
K. N. Shankara
S. G. Balekundri
Nandan Nilekani
Sudha Murthy
Vivek Kulkarni
Narayan Hosmane
Gururaj Deshpande

Mathematics

 D. C. Pavate
 Mahaviracharya
 Shakuntala Devi

Technology

Arun Netravali, Bell Lab
Kumar Malavalli, co-founder of Brocade Communication Systems
Sir M. Visvesvaraya

Engineering

Rajeshwari Chatterjee, Karnataka's first female engineer
S. S. Murthy, Electrical engineer

Economics

 N. S. Subba Rao

Literature

Classical writers

 Nripatunga Amoghavarsha
 Asaga
 Ranna, 10th-century poet
 Janna
 Adikavi Pampa
 Sri Ponna
 Shivakotiacharya
 Muddana, 19th-century poet and author
 Andayya, 13th-century writer
 Gangadevi, 14th-century poet and author
 Kumaravyasa
 Harihara, poet
 Lakshmisha (Jaimeni Bharatha in Kannada)
 Raghavanka
 Rudrabhatta
 Basavanna
 Akka Mahadevi
 Sarvajna
 Tirumalamba
 Purandaradasa
 Kanakadasa
 Trivikrama Panditacharya
 Narayana Panditacharya
 Kumudendu Muni, author of Siribhoovalaya
 Shishunaala Sharif Saheba, first Muslim poet in Kannada literature

Modern writers

 A.N. Krishna Rao
 Anupama Niranjana
 Aravind Adiga, won the Man Booker Prize in 2008
 B. G. L. Swamy
 B. M. Srikantaiah
 Beechi, comedian from Bellary District
 Chandrashekhara Kambara
 Da. Ra. Bendre
 D. Javare Gowda
 Jayalakshmi Seethapura
 D. V. Gundappa
 G. P. Rajarathnam
 Girish Karnad
 Gopalakrishna Adiga
 Gorur Ramaswamy Iyengar
 Ha Ma Nayak
 H. S. Krishnaswamy Iyengar
 K. S. Narasimhaswamy
 K. S. Nissar Ahmed
 K. Anantharamu
 Kota Shivarama Karanth
 Kuvempu
 M. Govinda Pai
 Maasti Venkatesh Ayengar
 Maya Kamath, political cartoonist
 P. Lankesh
 Panchakshari Hiremath
 A.K. Ramanujan
 Poornachandra Tejaswi
 P. T. Narasimhachar
 R. C. Hiremath
 R. K. Narayan, settler
 Raja Rao
 S. Srikanta Sastri
 S. L. Bhyrappa
 Shatavadhani Dr. R. Ganesh
 Shashi Deshpande
 T. P. Kailasam
 T. R. Subba Rao
 T. N. Srikantaiah
 U. R. Ananthamurthy
 V. K. Gokak
 Yashwant Chittal
 Ferdinand Kittel
 Dinakara Desai
 Venkatesh Galaganath

Politicians

 K.C. Reddy, former Chief Minister
 Kadidal Manjappa, former Chief Minister
 Kengal Hanumanthaiah, former Chief Minister
 Siddaramaiah, former Chief Minister
 Shantaveri Gopala Gowda, Socialist leader, former MLA
 S. Nijalingappa, former Chief Minister 
 Devaraj Urs, former Chief Minister
 Kamaladevi Chattopadhyaya, freedom fighter
 Basappa Danappa Jatti, former Vice-President
 Gudleppa Hallikeri, freedom fighter, former Chairman of the Legislative Council.
 M.N. Jois, freedom fighter, former M.L.C, Dy Speaker of Legislative Council
 Bantwal Vaikunta Baliga, former Law Minister; former Speaker, Mysore State
 Gundu Rao, former Chief Minister
 Ramakrishna Hegde, former Chief Minister
 Sudheendra Kulkarni
 Prabhakar Kore, member of Rajya Sabha from Karnataka
 S.R.Kanti, former Chief Minister
 Neeraj Patil, Mayor of Lambeth district of London
 S.R.Bommai, former Chief Minister
 Veerendra Patil, former Chief Minister
 S.Bangarappa, former Chief Minister
 Veerappa Moily, former Chief Minister
 L. G. Havanur, former Law Minister
 H.D. Deve Gowda, former prime minister
 J.H.Patel, former Chief Minister
 George Fernandes, former Defense Minister
 S.M. Krishna, Governor of Maharashtra, former Chief Minister
 Dharam Singh, former Chief Minister
 H.D.Kumaraswamy, former Chief Minister
 B.S.Yediyurappa, former Chief Minister, MP
 D.V. Sadananda Gowda, former Chief Minister and present union Statistics and Program implementation minister 
 Jagadish Shettar, former Chief Minister
 Ramesh Jigajinagi, former Home Minister, currently Union Minister of state for drinking water and sanitation and M.P
 M.P. Prakash, former deputy Chief Minister
 Oscar Fernandes, former Union Minister
 Jaffer Sharief, former Union Minister
 Margaret Alva, former Union Minister
 U. Srinivas Mallya, former Member of Parliament 
 H.N.Ananth Kumar, Union Minister for chemicals and fertilizers & M.P.
 Mallikarjun Kharge, former Home Minister, former Union Railway Minister
 K.H. Muniyappa, former Union minister of state for Railways
 V.S.Acharya, former Minister for Home affairs & Medical Education
 H.Vishwanath, former Minister, former M.P
 Vatal Nagaraj, former MLA
 Vishweshwara Hegde, former Education Minister
 Bhagwanth Khuba,  Member of Parliament,  Bidar

Bureaucrats
 C B Muthamma, first woman IFS officer
 C. G. Somiah, Comptroller and Auditor General of India (1990-1996)
 Shankar Bidari, IPS, DG & IPG, Karnataka
 Abdul Rahman Infant, IPS, DG & IGP, Karnataka
Dr.M.H.Marigowda, former Director of Horticulture
 H. T. Sangliana, former police officer, and M.P. Lok Sabha
 Daya Nayak
 Kempaiah
 Veeranna Aivalli
Vivek Kulkarni

Cooperative movement
 S. K. Amin, founder of South Kanara District Co-Operative Fish Marketing Federation

Religion and philosophy

 Sarvajna
 Sree Sree Shivakumara Swamiji, Karnataka Ratna, highest civilian awarded by the state
 Kanaka Dasa, saint
 Basavanna, founder of Veerashaivism, social reformer
 Purandara Dasa, saint
 Vidyaranya, 12th Shankaracharya of Sringeri, spiritual guide to Vijayanagar Empire
 Allama Prabhu
 Madhvacharya
 Mangesh V. Nadkarni
 Raghavendra Swami
 Akka Mahadevi
 Jayatirtha
 Sripadaraya
 Vyasatirtha
 Vadirajatirtha
 Madhvacharya
 Naraharitirtha
 Padmanabha Tirtha
 Raghaveshwara Bharathi
 Raghunatha Tirtha
 Raghuvarya Tirtha
 Raghuttama Tirtha
 Gangadharendra Saraswati
 Balagangadharanatha Swamiji
 Shivamurthy Shivacharya Mahaswamiji
 Satyavrata Tirtha
 Satyanidhi Tirtha
 Satyanatha Tirtha
 Satyapriya Tirtha
 Satyabodha Tirtha
 Satyasandha Tirtha
 Satyadharma Tirtha
 Satyadhyana Tirtha
 Satyapramoda Tirtha
 Shishunala Sharifa
 Jaggi Vasudev, founder of Isha Foundation
Siddharudha Swami
Narayan Maharaj
Narayanacharya
Dattatreya
Kaadsiddheshwar
Keshavashram

Yoga

 Tirumalai Krishnamacharya, known as "the father of modern yoga" and reviver of Hatha yoga
 B.K.S. Iyengar
 Geeta Iyengar
 Jaggi Vasudev
 Malladihalli Sri Raghavendra Swamiji
 Pattabhi Jois

Wildlife and environment
 Hanumappa Sudarshan
 Ullas Karanth, tiger conservation
 Krupakar-Senani
 Vandana Shiva

Historians, epigraphists and archaeologists
 Dr. Shikaripura Ranganatha Rao
 Dr. B.A. Saletore
 P. B. Desai
 P. Gururaja Bhat
 G. S. Gai
 A. N. Narasimhia
 B. L. Rice
 S. Srikanta Sastri

Social service

Sree Sree Shivakumara Swamiji
S. K. Amin
Malladihalli Sri Raghavendra Swamiji
Sudha Murthy
 Tulsi Gowda
Veerendra Heggade
Saalumarada Thimmakka

Sports

Cricket

 Vijay Bhardwaj
 Raghuram Bhat
 Roger Binny
 Stuart Binny
 Bhagwat Chandrasekhar
 Deepak Chougule
 Rahul Dravid
 Doddanarasaiah Ganesh
 David Johnson
 Sunil Joshi
 Syed Kirmani
 Vinay Kumar
 Anil Kumble
 Sanjay Manjrekar
 Abhimanyu Mithun
 Manju Nadgoda
 Manish Pandey
 Brijesh Patel
 Venkatesh Prasad
 E.A.S. Prasanna
 KL Rahul 
 A. Ramakrishnappa
 Shantha Rangaswamy
 Barrington Rowland
 Ganesh Satish
 Sujith Somasunder
 Javagal Srinath
 Robin Uthappa
 Gundappa Vishwanath
 Sadanand Viswanath

Hockey
 B. P. Govinda (former captain, Arjun award)
 M. P. Ganesh (former captain, Arjun Award)
 Ashish Ballal
 Arjun Halappa
 M M Somaiya (former captain)

Football
 Vinoth Kumar
 Xavier Vijay Kumar
 N.S. Manju
 Kuppuswami Sampath
 Shankar Sampingiraj
 Karma Tsewang
 Sanjeeva Uchil (Represented India in 1948 Olympics)

Athletics
Ashwini Nachappa
J. J. Shobha
Vandana Rao
Vandana Shanbagh  
Vikas Gowda  
Girisha Nagarajegowda  Para-athletics

Badminton
Prakash Padukone
Anup Sridhar
Ashwini Ponnappa

Tennis
Rohan Bopanna
Poojashree Venkatesh
Srinath Prahlad

Others
C.C. Machaiah, former boxer, Olympian and coach, 1978 Arjuna Awardee
Chetan Baboor, Table Tennis
Nisha Millet, Swimming
Pankaj Advani, Billiards
Malathi Krishnamurthy Holla

Military
 Ajjamada B Devaiah, Pilot in Indian air force, Maha Vir Chakra (posthumous), war martyr.
 Field Marshal K.M. Cariappa, Commander-in-Chief, Indian Armed Forces
 Gen.K. S. Thimayya, Chief of Staff, Indian Army
 Gen. A C Iyappa, Prisoner-of-War in World War II, Indian Army, BEL chief.
 Air Marshal C D Subbaiah, VrC, PVSM, World War II fighter pilot, Indian Army.
 Ramesh Halagali, AVSM, SM, Deputy Chief of Indian Army.
 Major M C Muthanna, killed by terrorists in Jammu and Kashmir, Shaurya Chakra awardee.
 Major Sandeep Unnikrishnan, killed in action during the November 2008 Mumbai attacks, consequently awarded the Ashoka Chakra, Indian Army

Judiciary
Justice Manepalli Narayana Rao Venkatachaliah, retired Chief Justice of the Supreme Court
Justice N Y Hanumanthappa, Chief Justice of Orissa High Court and Ex-Member of Parliament, Chitra Durga
Justice Santhosh Hegde, retired Supreme Court Judge
Justice H.L.Dattu, retired Chief Justice of the Supreme Court
Justice V. Gopala Gowda, Supreme Court Judge
 Chief Justice of India P. B. Gajendragadkar, from Gajendragad

Award winners

Bharat Ratna
 Sir M. Visvesvaraya, 1955
 Bhimsen Joshi, 2008
 C.N.R. Rao, 2014

Jnanpith Award
 Kuvempu, for his epic Sri Ramayana Darshanam, in 1969
 D. R. Bendre, for his anthology of poems Naku Thanthi, in 1974 
 K. Shivaram Karanth, for his novel Mookajjiya Kanasugalu, in 1977
 Masti Venkatesha Iyengar, for his historical novel Chikkaveera Rajendra, in 1983
 V. K. Gokak, for Bharatha Sindhu Rashmi, in 1990
 U. R. Ananthamurthy, for his monumental contributions, in 1994
 Girish Karnad, for his monumental contributions to Kannada literature and for contributions to Kannada theatre (Yayati), in 1998
 Chandrashekhara Kambara, for his monumental contributions to Kannada literature, in 2010

Saraswati Samman
 S. L. Bhyrappa, for his novel Mandra, in 2010

Militants
Iqbal Bhatkal
Kafeel Ahmed, 2007 London car bombing
Riyaz Bhatkal
Yasin Bhatkal

Others
 Shakuntala Devi, calculating prodigy; "called human computer"
 N. Someswara, doctor and quiz master of Thatt Antha Heli
 Aluru Venkata Rao
 Huilgol Narayana Rao
 Ravi Belagere
 Mayurasharma
 Pulakesi I
 Krishna Deva Raya
 Kudroli Ganesh, magician
 Kumara Rama
 Somesvara I
 Belawadi Mallamma
 Kittur Chennamma
 Attimabbe
 Raghavendra Acharya
 Pandita Ramabai, reformer for women's education, Sanskrit scholar, Christian Bible translator into Marathi
 Saraswati Gangadhar
 S. D. Phadnis, cartoonist
 A. N. Prahlada Rao, crossword writer; created 40,000 crosswords; name mentioned in LIMCA Book of Records 2015

See also
 List of Kannada poets
 List of people from Bangalore
 Kannadigas
 Tuluva
 Kodava people
 Konkani people
 Lists of Indians by state
 List of Lingayats
 Kannada people
 Recipients of the Karnataka Ratna
 People from Uttara Kannada District
 People from Belgaum District
 People from Bagalkot District
 People from Bellary District
 People from Bidar District
 People from Bijapur District
 People from Gadag District
 People from Gulbarga District
 People from Haveri District
 People from Koppal District
 People from Raichur District

References

Karnataka

Lists of people from Karnataka